Giovanni Bizzelli (1556 – around 1 August 1607 or 1612) was an Italian painter of the late-Mannerist period. He was a pupil of Alessandro Allori. He afterwards went to Rome. On his return to Florence he helped Antonio Tempesta in the decoration of the vaults of the Uffizi Corridor.

Works 
 Pietà (1579, Pieve di San'Ippolito)
 Annunciation (1584, Uffizi, Florencia)
 St Macario enthroned with St Jerome and St Francis (1585-1590), Sant'Angelo a Lecore church, Signa
 Joanna of Austria with her son Philip de Medici (1586, Uffizi)
 Adoration of the Shepherds (Colegio del Corpus Christi, Valencia)
 Penitent Magdalen (Museum of Fine Arts, Valencia)
 Pentecost (c. 1590), San Pietro a Grignano church, Grignano, neighborhood of Prato
 Coronation of Virgin by Trinity with Saints John the Baptist, John Evangelist, Romualdo e Benedetto (1600), San Giovanni Evangelista Monastery, Pratovecchio
 Martyrdom of St James the Great (1601) Santa Maria Maddalena de' Pazzi, Florence
 Baptism of St Augustine (1603), Chiesa di Sant'Agostino, Prato
 Frescoes at Santa Maria Maddalena de' Pazzi church, Borgo Pinti, Florence

References

1556 births
1612 deaths
16th-century Italian painters
Italian male painters
17th-century Italian painters
Painters from Florence
Italian Mannerist painters